John Bluford Scheneberg (November 20, 1887 – September 26, 1950) was a pitcher in Major League Baseball. He played for the Pittsburgh Pirates and St. Louis Browns.

References

External links

1887 births
1950 deaths
Major League Baseball pitchers
Pittsburgh Pirates players
St. Louis Browns players
Baseball players from West Virginia
Sportspeople from Huntington, West Virginia
Paris Bourbonites players
Savannah Indians players
Columbus Senators players
Valdosta Millionaires players
Springfield Reapers players
Muskegon Muskies players
Richmond Virginians (minor league) players
Kansas City Blues (baseball) players